Princess Marie Isabelle of Orléans (María Isabel de Orleans y Borbón; 21 September 1848 – 23 April 1919) was born an infanta of Spain and a Princess of Orléans and became the Countess of Paris by marriage.

Biography
She was born in Seville to Prince Antoine, Duke of Montpensier and  Infanta Luisa Fernanda of Spain. Antoine was the youngest son of Louis-Philippe I, the last King of France, and Maria Amalia of Naples and Sicily. Infanta Luisa was the daughter of Ferdinand VII of Spain and his fourth wife Maria Christina of the Two Sicilies. All four of her grandparents and seven of her eight great-grandparents were members of the French Royal House of Bourbon.

Marriage and issue
On 30 May 1864 at St. Raphael's Church in Kingston upon Thames, England, when she was only fifteen, Isabelle married her cousin Philippe d'Orléans, claimant to the French throne as Philippe VII. They had eight children:

Princess Amélie d'Orléans (1865–1951). She married Carlos I of Portugal in 1886.
 Prince Philippe, Duke of Orléans (1869–1926). Married Archduchess Maria Dorothea of Austria daughter of Archduke Joseph Karl of Austria in 1896,
Princess Hélène of Orléans (1871–1951).  She married Emmanuel Philibert, 2nd Duke of Aosta in 1895.
 Prince Charles d'Orléans (1875–1875).
 Princess Isabelle d'Orléans (1878–1961). She married Prince Jean, Duke of Guise in 1899.
 Prince Jacques d'Orléans (1880–1881).
Princess Louise d'Orléans (1882–1958). She married Carlos of Bourbon-Two Sicilies, Infante of Spain in 1907. Through her daughter Maria Mercedes of Bourbon-Two Sicilies, she was the great-grandmother of King Felipe VI of Spain.
 Ferdinand d'Orléans, Duke of Montpensier (1884–1924).  He married Marie Isabelle Gonzales de Olañeta et Ibaretta, Marquesa de Valdeterrazo in 1921.

As the French royal family had been in exile since their grandfather King Louis Philippe abdicated in 1848, Marie Isabelle and her husband first lived at York House, Twickenham. In 1871 the family was allowed to return to France, where they lived in the Hôtel Matignon in Paris and in the Château d'Eu in Normandy.

The Countess of Paris was known for her rather masculine habits of smoking cigars and participating in field sports, especially shooting, yet could surprise people with her elegance on formal occasions.

In 1886, they were forced to leave France for a second time. In 1894, her husband died in exile at Stowe House in Buckinghamshire. Marie Isabelle lived in the Château de Randan in France, and died in 1919 at her palace in Villamanrique de la Condesa, near Seville.

Ancestry

References

 Généalogie des rois et des princes by Jean-Charles Volkmann Edit. Jean-Paul Gisserot (1998)
 "The Wandering Princess: Princess Hélène of France, Duchess of Aosta (1871-1951), by Edward Hanson.  Fonthill, 2017.

External links
 Le château d'Eu musée Louis-Philippe The museum in the château d'Eu

|-

|-

1848 births
1919 deaths
Princesses of France (Orléans)
Countesses of Paris
House of Orléans-Galliera
People from Seville
Burials at the Chapelle royale de Dreux
Dames of the Order of Saint Isabel